Darren Joseph Norman Oldaker (born 4 January 1999) is an English professional footballer who plays as a midfielder for Chesterfield.

Playing career
Oldaker began his career in the Queens Park Rangers youth team, but was ready to quit the game when Dennis Wise recommended him to Gillingham. He had a trial at the club and was soon signed onto scholarship forms. He signed professional forms in May 2016. He made his League One debut on 20 August 2016, coming on as a 75th-minute substitute for Emmanuel Osadebe in a 5–0 defeat to Scunthorpe United at Glanford Park. He scored on his first start for the "Gills" ten days later, in a 2–1 defeat to Luton Town in an EFL Trophy match at Priestfield Stadium.

In February 2017 he signed on loan for Isthmian League South Division team Hythe Town, making his debut for the side in a 2–1 victory over Herne Bay on 6 February 2017.

On 21 August 2019, it was announced that Oldaker had left Gillingham after the club, along with the player, decided to terminate his contract by mutual consent.

The following month, Oldaker signed on non-contract terms for National League South side Billericay Town. After just three appearances for Billericay and two for Westfield, he signed for former club Hythe Town on 24 January 2020.

On 5 February 2021, Oldaker signed for National League South side Welling United. He made three appearances for The Wings before the COVID-19 pandemic curtailed the remainder of the campaign. On 28 May 2021, he subsequently agreed to return to Hythe Town, despite signing on for another campaign with Welling prior to the announcement.

On 23 November 2021, after featuring heavily for Hythe, Oldaker made his return to the National League South to join Surrey-based Dorking Wanderers.

Having achieved promotion through the National League South play-offs, Oldaker signed for fellow National League club Chesterfield.

Career statistics

External links

References

1999 births
Living people
English footballers
Association football midfielders
Queens Park Rangers F.C. players
Gillingham F.C. players
Hythe Town F.C. players
Billericay Town F.C. players
Welling United F.C. players
Westfield F.C. (Surrey) players
Dorking Wanderers F.C. players
Chesterfield F.C. players
English Football League players
Isthmian League players
National League (English football) players